Samvritha Sunil (born 31 October 1986) is an Indian actress who appears in Malayalam films. She made her debut in 2004 through the film Rasikan directed by Lal Jose before which she had also appeared as a junior artist in the film Ayal Kadha Ezhuthukayanu. 

Her best known films include Arabikkatha (2007), Chocolate (2007), Thirakkatha (2008), Boomi Malayalam (2009), Cocktail (2010), Manikyakkallu (2011), Swapna Sanchari (2011), Arike (2012), Diamond Necklace (2012) and Ayalum Njanum Thammil (2012). After a hiatus of 6 years, she made her comeback through the television show Nayika Nayakan.

Early and personal life

Samvritha was born into a family in Chalad, Kannur  northern Kerala. She has a younger sister Sanjuktha Sunil, who did the sound recording of the film Spanish Masala.

Samvritha did her schooling at St. Teresa's Anglo Indian Higher Secondary School, Kannur. She graduated in communicative English from St. Teresa's College, Eranakulam and did her master's degree in advertising from Annamalai University. Samvritha married US-based engineer Akhil Jayaraj on 1 November 2012 at Kannur. She has 2 sons.

Career

Samvritha's entry into the film industry happened with Rasikan (2004) with Dileep in the lead. The film was directed by Lal Jose. Samvritha later associated in three more films with Lal Jose. After Rasikan, she acted in films like Chandrolsavam (2005) and Nerariyan CBI (2005). Both the films were directed by veterans and had ensemble casts led by Mohanlal and Mammootty respectively. It was her character Sherly in Lal Jose's Achanurangatha Veedu (2005). Her characters in Moonnamathoral (2006), Pothan Vava (2006) and Vaasthavam (2006) were memorable. Later, she starred in many films including Arabikkatha (2007), Chocolate (2007), Minnaminnikoottam (2008), and Thirakkatha (2008). She appeared in a guest role in Priyanandanan's national award-winning film Pulijanmam (2006) and Rafi Mecartin's Hallo (2007).

The actress also made her Tamil debut in Uyir, where she played the heroine opposite Srikanth. Her debut Telugu movie was Evadithe Nakenti (2007), a remake of Malayalayam film Lion. She also acted in  Diamond Necklace in which she acted along with Fahadh Faasil, directed by Lal Jose. She also appeared in Mallu Singh co-starring Unni Mukundan and Kunchacko Boban. She was part of movies like Mallu Singh and The King and The Commissioner in 2012 and was selected as Top Star (Female) 2012 in Malayalam. 

In 2018, she made her comeback through the television show Nayika Nayakan on Mazhavil Manorama. The same year her film Kaalchilambu released after delaying for ten years. She had also acted in a Hindi film The White Elephant which failed to see theatrical release.

Filmography

Television

References

External links
 

Actresses from Kannur
Actresses in Malayalam cinema
Living people
Actresses in Tamil cinema
Actresses in Telugu cinema
Indian film actresses
21st-century Indian actresses
1986 births
Child actresses in Malayalam cinema
20th-century Indian actresses
St. Teresa's College alumni